The R268 road is a regional road in Ireland, located in County Donegal, on the west bank of Lough Swilly.

References

Regional roads in the Republic of Ireland
Roads in County Donegal